Leona Vicario is one of the communities in the municipality of Puerto Morelos, Quintana Roo. The town is named for Leona Vicario the wife of Mexican Independence figure Andrés Quintana Roo. Its population was 6,791 inhabitants at the 2020 census.

References

Populated places in Quintana Roo